Hemiclepsis marginata is a species of annelids belonging to the family Glossiphoniidae.

The species is found in Eurasia.

References

Clitellata
Animals described in 1773
Invertebrates of Europe
Invertebrates of Asia